Pertti "Pepe" Willberg (formerly Toivo Pertti Uolevi Willberg, till 1955 Kaukonen; born on 17 December 1946) is a Finnish singer, songwriter and guitarist.

Biography 
Willberg was born in Turku and started his musical career in the beginning of the 1960s, playing the rhythm guitar in a Lauttasaari (Helsinki) based band called the Islanders. Since then he has performed, for example as the lead singer for the bands Jormas and Pepe & Paradise. In addition to his solo career Willberg has also appeared with groups such as the Finntastic, Mestarit (Masters), and Poptenorit (Poptenors). His tenth solo album Pepe & Saimaa was nominated for IMPALA's European Independent Album of the Year Award.

Discography

Solo albums
 Sinulle (1976)
 Päivä tuskin päättyis kauniimmin (1979)
 20 vuotta (1984)
 Kun joulu on (albumi) (1986)
 Yksi ruusu (1986)
 Tulit valona maailmaan (1990)
 Syliisi aamuun jään (1999)
 Kynttilöiden syttyessä (2005)
 Kaukaa kaipaan (2007)
 Pepe & Saimaa (2014)

Co-operative albums
 Jormas: Jormas (album) (1966)
 M. A. Numminen ystävineen: M. A. Numminen In memoriam (1967) (vocal in "Viiskulmassa on viisi kulmaa")
 Jormas: Sincerely! (1968)
 Pepe & Paradise: Niin vähän on aikaa (1972)
 Pepe & Paradise: Pepe & Paradise (album) (1973)
 Pepe & Paradise: Pepe & Paradise 2 (1975)
 Hukkaputki: Hukkaa päälle! (1983)
 Mestarit: Mestarit Areenalla (1999)
 Tommy Tabermann & Olli Ahvenlahti: Kaksi ihoa (2007)

Collections
 Pepe Willberg & Jormas: Pepen parhaat - The Best of Pepe (1972)
 Parhaat päältä -  The top of the tops (1978)
 Parhaat (Pepe Willberg/Overdisc) - The Best (1987)
 Parhaat (Pepe Willberg/Fazer Finnlevy) -  The Best (1989)
 Toivotut - The Most Wanted (1992)
 20 suosikkia – Rööperiin - 20 Favourites – To Rodberg (1996)
 Jormas: 20 suosikkia – Saat miehen kyyneliin -  20 Favourites – You Make a Man Cry (1996)
 20 suosikkia – Lady Madonna-  20 Favourites – Lady Madonna (1998)
 14 suomalaista kestosuosikkia - 14 All Time Favourites of Finland (1998)
 14 rakastettua kansanlaulua -  14 Loved Folk Songs (1998)
 Elämältä kaiken sain -  I Got Everything from My Life (1999)
 Pepe & Paradise: 70's Radio Hits (2000)
 Jormas: Saat miehen Rööperiin -  You'll Get a Man to Rodberg (2001)
 Lauluja rakkaudesta (Pepe Willberg) -  Songs of Love (2006)
 Luokses palaan taas (2CD) - I'll Come Back to You (2006)

Charts

(Albums appearing in Suomen virallinen lista)

References

See also 

 
 Unofficial webpage for Pepe Willberg
 Pepe Willberg in Pomus.net
 Jormas & Pepe Willberg. YLE Elävä arkisto. (The tape archives of the Finnish Broadcasting Company.)

20th-century Finnish male singers
1946 births
Living people
Musicians from Turku